In enzymology, a glyceraldehyde-3-phosphate dehydrogenase (ferredoxin) is an enzyme that catalyzes the chemical reaction

D-glyceraldehyde-3-phosphate + H2O + 2 oxidized ferredoxin  3-phospho-D-glycerate + 2 H+ + 2 reduced ferredoxin

The 3 substrates of this enzyme are D-glyceraldehyde-3-phosphate, H2O, and oxidized ferredoxin, whereas its 3 products are 3-phospho-D-glycerate, H+, and reduced ferredoxin.

This enzyme belongs to the family of oxidoreductases, specifically those acting on the aldehyde or oxo group of donor with an iron-sulfur protein as acceptor.  The systematic name of this enzyme class is D-glyceraldehyde-3-phosphate:ferredoxin oxidoreductase. Other names in common use include GAPOR, glyceraldehyde-3-phosphate Fd oxidoreductase, and glyceraldehyde-3-phosphate ferredoxin reductase.

References

 
 

EC 1.2.7
Enzymes of unknown structure